Karin (or Garin) was a region of historic Armenia, roughly encompassing parts of the Erzurum and Muş Provinces in present-day Turkey.

Former regions of Armenia